Bonnie Brawner  is an American Paralympic volleyball player, and teacher.

Career
She won a bronze medal at the 2004 Summer Paralympics which were held in Athens, Greece.

References

External links

Living people
Paralympic volleyball players of the United States
Paralympic bronze medalists for the United States
Medalists at the 2004 Summer Paralympics
Volleyball players at the 2004 Summer Paralympics
American sitting volleyball players
Women's sitting volleyball players
1988 births
Paralympic medalists in volleyball